Alexei Popyrin defeated Alexander Bublik 4–6, 6–0, 6–2 to claim his first ATP Tour Men's Singles tennis title at the 2021 Singapore Open. The Singapore Tennis Open was a new addition to the ATP Tour in 2021

Seeds
The top four seeds receive a bye into the second round.

Draw

Finals

Top half

Bottom half

Qualifying

Seeds

Qualifiers

Qualifying draw

First qualifier

Second qualifier

Third qualifier

Fourth qualifier

References

External links
 Main draw
 Qualifying draw

2021 ATP Tour